Luzuko Vulindlu (born 14 November 1987) is a South African professional rugby union player who last played for the  in the Pro14. His regular playing positions are centre and winger.

Playing career

Sharks / Emerging Springboks

Vulindlu moved to Durban to join the  academy in 2005, representing them at Under-19 level in 2005 and 2006 and at Under-21 level in 2007.

He opened the scoring for the Wildebeest in the fourth minute of the match, but his side fell short, losing 28–35 in the match played in Brakpan. He made one more start during the regular season, helping the Wildebeest to fourth spot on the Southern Section log to secure a quarter final spot, and also came on as a replacement in the quarter final match against , which the team from Cape Town won 22–14 to eliminate the Wildebeest from the competition. He reverted to Under-21 level for the remainder of 2008, appearing for the s in the Under-21 Provincial Championship.

In 2009, Vulindlu was he was included in the  squad for the 2009 Super 14 season. He was named as their starting left winger and took advantage of the opportunity, scoring his first Super Rugby try and being named the Man of the Match in the Sharks' 33–17 victory.

Soon after the Super Rugby season, Vulindlu played in the Sharks' match against the British & Irish Lions during their 2009 tour to South Africa, which the Sharks lost 3–39. He had another opportunity to face the touring side, as he was selected in an Emerging Springboks side that faced the Lions two weeks later. He started the match and helped his side secure a 13–all draw against the tourists.

Auch

In 2011, Vulindlu joined French Pro D2 team Auch for the 2011–12 Rugby Pro D2 season. He made his first appearance for his new team in a 15–9 victory over Albi, starting the match as the inside centre. He made this position his own, starting thirteen matches in that position during the course of the season, scoring one try in his eighth match for Auch against . He also appeared as a replacement in one match, for an overall record of one try in fourteen appearances for his side.

Griquas

After just one season at Auch, he returned to South Africa, where he joined  on a trial basis prior to the 2012 Currie Cup Premier Division season.

He started their quarter final match against , where a 21–13 victory from the team from Cape Town promptly ended Griquas involvement in the competition.

They qualified for a promotion/relegation play-off series against the  – which they eventually lost, forcing them to play in a 2014 Currie Cup qualification series for a spot in the 2014 Currie Cup Premier Division – but Vulindlu had no involvement in these matches.

SWD Eagles

Vulindlu joined George-based side  on loan from Griquas during the 2013 Currie Cup First Division season. He featured in their final four matches of the regular season of the competition, helping them to finish in fourth spot and qualify for the semi-finals.

Vulindlu's loan move was made permanent when he was contracted by SWD for 2014. Due to injury, he didn't feature for them at all during their 2014 Vodacom Cup campaign which saw them reach the quarter finals, but returned to action for their 2014 Currie Cup qualification series. However, the SWD Eagles finished in fourth spot on the log, failing to clinch the 2014 Currie Cup Premier Division berth, instead qualifying to the 2014 Currie Cup First Division.

Vulindlu started seven of the SWD Eagles' matches during the 2015 Vodacom Cup competition in the inside centre position. He also started all six of their matches in the 2015 Currie Cup qualification series, scoring one try against his former side,  in a 21–41 defeat. The SWD Eagles had a poor season, finishing bottom of the log with just one victory to their name to qualify for the 2015 Currie Cup First Division. Vulindlu started that match, in which his side upset the defending champions, running out 47–40 winners.

Southern Kings

At the start of 2016, Vulindlu was one of two SWD Eagles players that joined the ' Super Rugby squad for a trial period as they prepared for the 2016 Super Rugby season. After training with the side for a few weeks, it was confirmed that his trial was successful and was included in the squad.

References

South African rugby union players
Living people
1987 births
Griquas (rugby union) players
Sharks (Currie Cup) players
Sharks (rugby union) players
Rugby union wings
People from Makhanda, Eastern Cape
Southern Kings players
Rugby union players from the Eastern Cape